Gnathonargus is a monotypic genus of North American dwarf spiders containing the single species, Gnathonargus unicorn. It was first described by S. C. Bishop & C. R. Crosby in 1935, and has only been found in the United States.

The species name alludes to the diagnostic projection issuing from the clypeus in males, an elongate, slender rod with a rounded end that points diagonally upward.

See also
 List of Linyphiidae species (A–H)

References

Linyphiidae
Monotypic Araneomorphae genera
Spiders of the United States